Smilla Sundell (born 12 November 2004) is a Swedish Muay Thai kickboxer. On April 22, 2022, she became the youngest person to ever win a world title in Muay Thai by defeating Jackie Buntan to win the ONE Women's Strawweight (125 lbs) Title.

Muay Thai career

ONE Championship 
In her ONE Championship debut, ONE: Full Circle on February 25, 2022, she challenged Diandra Martin in ONE Strawweight Muay Thai debut by TKO at round 3.

At ONE 156 on April 22, 2022, she challenged Jackie Buntan for the inaugural ONE Strawweight Muay Thai World Championship. Sundell would win by unanimous decision, claiming her youngest person to ever win a world title.

Championships and awards 
ONE Championship
 ONE Women's Strawweight Muay Thai World Championship (One time;current)
 Youngest person to win a world title in ONE Muay Thai
 Performance of the Night (One time)

Fight record 

|-  style="background:#cfc;"
| 2022-04-22 || Win ||align=left| Jackie Buntan || ONE 156 || Kallang, Singapore || Decision (Unanimous) || 5 || 3:00 
|-
! style=background:white colspan=9 |
|-  style="background:#cfc;"
| 2022-02-25 || Win ||align=left| Diandra Martin || ONE: Full Circle || Kallang, Singapore || TKO (3 Knockdowns)|| 3 || 1:35 

|-  style="background:#c5d2ea;"
| 2020-12-13 || Draw ||align=left| Fahseethong Sitzoraueng || Super Champ Muay Thai || Bangkok, Thailand || Decision || 3 || 3:00 

|-  style="background:#cfc;"
| 2020-10-23 || Win ||align=left| Sawsing Sor Sopit || Super Champ Muay Thai || Bangkok, Thailand || Decision || 3 || 3:00 

|-  style="background:#cfc;"
| 2020-09-06 || Win ||align=left| Ponpan Por.Muengpetch || Super Champ Muay Thai || Bangkok, Thailand || KO (Knee to the head)|| 2 || 2:07 

|-  style="background:#cfc;"
| 2020-02-29 || Win ||align=left| Nicola Callander || Rogue Muay Thai || Eatons Hill, Queensland, Australia || Decision (Unanimous)|| 5 || 2:00
|-
| colspan=9 | Legend:

See also 
 List of ONE Championship champions
 List of current ONE fighters
 2022 in ONE Championship
 ONE Championship Record
 ONE 156
 Fairtex Gym
 List of ONE bonus award recipients

References

External links 
 Smilla Sundell at ONE
 

2004 births
Living people
People from Stockholm
Swedish female kickboxers
Swedish Muay Thai practitioners
ONE Championship kickboxers
21st-century Swedish women
ONE Championship champions